Transilien Paris-Est is a railway line of the Paris Transilien suburban rail network. The trains on this line travel between Gare de l'Est in central Paris and the east of Île-de-France region. Transilien services from Paris-Est are part of the SNCF Gare de l'Est rail network. They have a total of 83,000 passengers per weekday.

Stations served

Meaux line
Paris-Est
Chelles - Gournay Station
Vaires - Torcy Station
Lagny - Thorigny Station
Esbly Station
Meaux Station

Château-Thierry line
Paris-Est
Meaux Station
Trilport Station
Changis-Saint-Jean Station
La Ferté-sous-Jouarre Station
Nanteuil - Saâcy Station
Nogent-l'Artaud - Charly Station
Chézy-sur-Marne Station
Château-Thierry Station

La Ferté-Milon line
Paris-Est
Meaux Station
Trilport Station
Isles - Armentières - Congis Station
Lizy-sur-Ourcq Station
Crouy-sur-Ourcq Station
Mareuil-sur-Ourcq Station
La Ferté-Milon Station

Crécy-la-Chapelle line
Esbly Station
Montry - Condé Station
Couilly - Saint-Germain - Quincy Station
Villiers - Montbarbin Station
Crécy-la-Chapelle Station

Coulommiers line
Paris-Est
Tournan Station
Marles-en-Brie Station
Mortcerf Station
Guérard - La Celle-sur-Morin Station
Faremoutiers - Pommeuse Station
Mouroux Station
Coulommiers Station

Provins line
Paris-Est
Verneuil-l'Étang Station
Mormant Station
Nangis Station
Longueville Station
Sainte-Colombe - Septveilles Station
Champbenoist - Poigny Station
Provins Station

Services 
Line P is operated by the six following services:
Paris-Est - Meaux
Paris-Est - Meaux - Château-Thierry
Paris-Est - Meaux - La Ferté-Milon
Esbly - Crécy-la-Chapelle
Paris-Est - Coulommiers
Paris-Est - Provins
Line P uses a four-letter mission coding system. Only in the section between Paris-Est and Chateau-Thierry the trains display the mission code; otherwise they only appear on passenger information display systems and on timetables.

NOTE: EICE, EIME, RICE and RIME are mission codes used for the line/axis between Esbly and Crécy-la-Chapelle.

Rolling stock

Current Fleet

Past fleet

See also
 List of Transilien stations

References

Transilien